Ciardelli is an Italian surname. Notable people with the surname include:

 Andrea Reimann-Ciardelli (born 1956/57), American heiress
 Brooke Ciardelli, American theater and film director, producer and writer

Italian-language surnames